Totzauer like the spelling variant Dotzauer is a Sudeten German toponymic surname for an inhabitant of Totzau, a small village in northern Bohemia that was abandoned and destroyed in 1946. Notable people with the surname include:
Caren Totzauer, German wheelchair curler
Franz Totzauer (1911–1979), Austrian composer and conductor
Lisa Totzauer (born 1970), Austrian journalist
Sophie Totzauer (born 1992), Austrian model

References

German-language surnames